Vermont's 1st congressional district is an obsolete district. Vermont currently has one representative to the United States House of Representatives, elected statewide At-large. Until 1933, however, the state used to have multiple seats spread out into geographic districts.  During that time, the first district elected its own representative.

List of members representing the district

References

 Congressional Biographical Directory of the United States 1774–present

01
Former congressional districts of the United States
1791 establishments in Vermont
1933 disestablishments in Vermont
Constituencies established in 1791
Constituencies disestablished in 1933